Astrebla squarrosa, commonly known as bull Mitchell grass, is a long lived herb of the family Poaceae. Named in honour of Thomas Mitchell, it is regarded as the most flood tolerant of the Astrebla grasses. Often seen growing to 1.5 metres tall, on floodplains and heavy dark clay soils in arid to semi arid Australia. The coarse stems and difficult digestibility make this a less desirable Mitchell grass for livestock. Flowering is in response to rain.

References

Chloridoideae
Flora of Australia
Plants described in 1928